Before the Partition of India in 1947, about 584 princely states, also called "native states", existed in India, which were not fully and formally part of British India, the parts of the Indian subcontinent which had not been conquered or annexed by the British but under indirect rule, subject to subsidiary alliances.

Things moved quickly after the partition of British India in 1947. By the end of 1949, all of the states had chosen to accede to one of the newly independent states of India or Pakistan or else had been conquered and annexed.

Outline

In principle, the princely states had internal autonomy, while by treaty the British Crown had suzerainty and was responsible for the states' external affairs. In practice, while the states were indeed ruled by potentates with a variety of titles, such as Maharaja, Raja, Nizam, Raje, Deshmukh, Nawab, Mirza, Baig, Chhatrapati, Khan, Thakur Sahab, Darbar saheb or specially Jam for Jadeja/Samma, the British still had considerable influence.

By the time of the departure of the British in 1947, only four of the largest of the states still had their own British Resident, a diplomatic title for advisors present in the states' capitals, while most of the others were grouped together into Agencies, such as the Central India Agency, the Deccan States Agency, and the Rajputana Agency.

From 1920, the states were represented in the Chamber of Princes, which held its meetings in New Delhi.

The most important states were ranked as salute states, whose rulers were entitled to a given number of salute guns.

By the Indian Independence Act 1947, the British gave up their suzerainty of the states and left each of them free to choose whether to join one of the newly independent countries of India and Pakistan or to remain outside them. For a short time, some of the rulers explored the possibility of a federation of the states separate from either, but this came to nothing. Most of the states then decided to accede to India or to Pakistan, such as Junagadh (1947–1948), Hyderabad on 18 September 1948, Bilaspur on 12 October 1948, and Bhopal on 1 May 1949. Travancore also chose to remain an independent country.

In Jammu and Kashmir, a state with a Muslim majority but a Hindu ruler, the Maharaja hoped to remain independent but acceded to India on 27 October 1947 at the outset of the invasion of Jammu and Kashmir by Pakistan — leading to the Indo-Pakistani War of 1947.

On 31 March 1948, Kalat acceded to Pakistan, although the brother of the Khan led a rebellion against this decision.

Princely States at the time of independence on 14 August 1947

Individual residencies

Baluchistan Agency
Princely States of the Baluchistan Agency.

Deccan States Agency and Kolhapur Residency (Maratha)
Princely States of Deccan States Agency and Kolhapur Residency (Maratha).

Gwalior Residency (Maratha)
Princely States of the Gwalior Residency.

Madras Presidency
Princely States of the Madras Presidency.

North-west Frontier States Agency
Princely States of the North-West Frontier States Agency (all in present Pakistan).
Agencies included the Dir Swat and Chitral Agency and the Deputy Commissioner of Hazara acting as the Political Agent for Amb and Phulra.

Gilgit Agency
The States of Hunza and Nagar and many feudal Jagirs (Puniyal, Shigar, etc.) in the Gilgit Agency were tributary to the Maharaja of Jammu & Kashmir.

Province of Sind

Punjab state agency
States of the Punjab States Agency (Punjab).

States of the Rajputana Agency
States of the Rajputana Agency.

Gujarat States Agency and Baroda Residency

Kathiawar Agency

States of Central India Agency

 Ajaigarh
 Alipura
 Alirajpur
 Baraundha
 Barwani
 Basoda
 Bhaisunda
 Bhopal
 Bijawar
 Charkhari
 Chhatarpur
 Chirgaon
 Datia
 Dewas Junior
 Dewas Senior
 Dhar
 Dhurwai
 Gaurihar
 Gwalior
 Indore
 Jamnia
 Jaora
 Jaso
 Jobat
 Kamta-Rajaula
 Khaniadhana
 Khilchipur
 Kothi
 Kurwai
 Maihar
 Makrai
 Muhammadgarh
 Nagod
 Narsighgarh
 Orchha
 Pahra
 Paldeo
 Panna
 Pathari
 Piploda
 Rajgarh
 Ratlam
 Rewa
 Sailana
 Sitamau
 Sohawal
 Taraon
 Tori Fatehpur

States of the Eastern States Agency

Orissa States Agency

 Athgarh
 Athmallik
 Bamra
 Baramba
 Baudh
 Bonai
 Daspalla
 Dhenkanal
 Gangpur
 Hindol
 Kalahandi (Karond)
 Keonjhar
 Khandpara
 Kharsawan
 Mayurbhanj
 Narsinghpur
 Nayagarh
 Nilgiri
 Pal Lahara
 Patna (Balangir)
 Rairakhol
 Ranpur
 Seraikela
 Sonepur
 Talcher
 Tigiria

Chhattisgarh States Agency

 Bastar
 Changbhakar
 Chhuikandan
 Jashpur
 Kanker
 Kawardha
 Khairagarh
 Koriya (Korea)
 Nandgaon
 Raigarh
 Sakti
 Sarangarh
 Surguja
 Udaipur (Dharamjaigarh)

Bengal States Agency
 Cooch Behar
 Tripura

States of the Mahi Kantha Agency

 Idar
 Danta
 Vijaynagar (Pol)
 Malpur
 Mansa
 Mohanpur
 Ilol
 Katosan
 Ambaliara
 Pethapur
 Punadra
 Ranasa
 Dabha
 Dadhalia
 Rupal
 Varsoda
 Vasna

Former Princely States annexed during the British Raj 

 Ballabhgarh (1858)
 Banpur, seized in 1857
 Bhaddaiyan Raj (1858)
 Bijeraghogarh
 Chirgaon (one of the seized Hasht Bhaiya jagirs)
 Khaddi
 Kulpahar (1858)
 Makrai (1890 - 1893)
 Purwa (one of the seized Chaube Jagirs)
 Shahgarh, seized in 1857
 Tiroha
 Tulsipur (1859)
 Udaipur, Chhattisgarh (1854 - 1860)
 Vallabhipura (1860)
 Manipur (1891), the last princely state annexed, for a brief period.

Former kingdoms annexed during the British East India Company era 

  Carnatic (1801)
 Sivagangai (1803)
 Guler (1813)
 Jaitpur (1849)
  Jalaun (1840)
 Jaswan (1849)
  Jhansi (1854)
  Kangra (1846)
  Kumaon (1816)
  Lakhahi (?)
  Kutlehar (1825)
  Punjab, Multan (1849)
  Nagpur (1854)
 Nurpur (1849)
  Oudh (1856)
  Ramgarh (1858)
 Satara state (1849)

 Sambalpur (1849)
 Siba (1849)
 Tanjore (1855)

See also 

 List of princely states of British India (alphabetical)
 List of Maratha dynasties and states
 List of Rajput dynasties and states

Notes 

Sources
 Indian Princely States Genealogy
 Flags of Indian Princely States

Further reading
 The Relationship Between the Indian Princely States and the Indian Central Government, 1921-1933, by Harry Dunseth Wood. Published by University of Chicago, 1951.
 The Paramount Power and the Princely States of India, 1858-1881, by Ajit K. Neogy. Published by K. P. Bagchi, 1974.
 Rajahs and Prajas: An Indian Princely State, Then and Now, by S. Devadas Pillai. Published by Popular Prakashan, 1976.
 Princely States and the Paramount Power, 1858-1876: A Study on the Nature of Political Relationship Between the British Government and the Indian State, by Mihir Kumar Ray. Rajesh Publications, 1981.
 Documents and Speeches on the Indian Princely States, by Adrian Sever. Published by B.R. Pub. Corp., 1985.
 The Late Pre-colonial Background to the Indian Princely States, by Richard B Barnett. Published by Centre for South Asian Studies, University of Punjab, 1988.
 Indian Princely Medals: A Record of the Orders, Decorations, and Medals of the Indian Princely States, by Tony McClenaghan. Published by Spantech & Lancer, 1996. .
 British Policy Towards Princely States of India: Seminar Entitled "British Policy Towards North Indian Princely States" : Selected Papers, by R P Vyas. Published by Rajasthan-Vidya Prakashan, 1992.
 The Princely States of India: A Chronological Checklist of Their Rulers, by David P. Henige. Published by Borgo Press, 1997. .
 Constitutional Development in the Indian Princely States, by Ranjana Kaul. Published by UBS Publishers Distributors, 1998. .
 The Maharaja & the Princely States of India, by Sharada Dwivedi. Published by Lustre Press, 1999. .
 Illustrated Encyclopaedia & Who's who of Princely States in Indian Sub-continent, by J. C. Dua. Published by Kaveri Books, 2000. .
 The Golden Book of India: A Genealogical and Biographical Dictionary of the Ruling Princes, Chiefs, Nobles, and Other Personages, Titled or Decorated, of the Indian Empire, by Sir Roper Lethbridge. Adamant Media Corporation, 2001. .
 True Tales of British India & the Princely States: & The Princely States, by Michael Wise. Published by In Print, 1993. .
 Princely States of India: A Guide to Chronology and Rulers, by David P. Henige. Published by Orchid Press, 2006. .
 India's Princely States: People, Princes and Colonialism, by Waltraud Ernst, Biswamoy Pati. Published by Routledge, 2007. .

External links

Subdivisions of British India
History of Pakistan
Princely States
History of India
Pakistan history-related lists